Novye Kotlitsy is a rural locality (a village) in Kovarditskoye Rural Settlement, Muromsky District, Vladimir Oblast, Russia. The population was 3 as of 2010. There are 2 streets.

Geography 
Novye Kotlitsy is located 23 km northwest of Murom (the district's administrative centre) by road. Savkovo is the nearest rural locality.

References 

Rural localities in Muromsky District
Muromsky Uyezd